Queen Victoria Bridge, also known as Victoria Bridge, is a road bridge across the River Dee linking the main part of the City of Aberdeen with  Torry and the southern areas of the city. 

It was opened in May 1881. Built by Aberdeen City Council and partly funded by public subscription, it was constructed partly in response to the River Dee ferryboat disaster of 5 April 1876.

References

Bridges in Aberdeen
Bridges completed in 1881
1881 establishments in Scotland